
Gmina Sieniawa is an urban-rural gmina (administrative district) in Przeworsk County, Subcarpathian Voivodeship, in south-eastern Poland.

Villages
Apart from the town of Sieniawa, Gmina Sieniawa contains the villages and settlements of Czerce, Czerwona Wola, Dobra, Dybków, Leżachów, Paluchy, Pigany, Rudka and Wylewa.

Neighbouring gminas
Gmina Sieniawa is bordered by the gminas of Adamówka, Jarosław, Leżajsk, Tryńcza and Wiązownica.

References

Polish official population figures 2006

Sieniawa
Przeworsk County